TP-2.com (an abbreviation of Twelve Play-2) is the fourth solo album by American R&B recording artist R. Kelly, released on November 7, 2000, by Jive Records.

Background
Released as the "sequel" to Kelly's 12 Play, TP-2.com had party songs, relationship-themed ballads and a gospel-influenced song, but it still had Kelly's trademark sensuality with songs including "The Greatest Sex" and "Strip for You". The album was most notable for two number 1 R&B hits:  the tribute song "I Wish", and the party anthem, "Fiesta (Remix)", which featured Jay-Z. The latter duet inspired the two to create the collaborative project The Best of Both Worlds. Another notable single was the risque "Feelin' On Yo Booty". The album has since been certified 4× Platinum. The album was Kelly's second album to peak at number 1 on the Billboard 200 and the fourth to top the Top R&B/Hip-Hop Albums charts.  TP-2.com was the number one R&B Album on the Billboard Year-End chart for 2001.

Critical reception

TP-2.com received mostly positive reviews from music critics. Sonicnet wrote, "TP-2.com isn't the masterpiece Kelly seems capable of, but it's as strong an R&B album as any since, well, since R., balancing the carnal and the spiritual as convincingly as anyone's done it since Prince in the 1980s." Billboard wrote, "Not to be outdone by the generation of singers he has influenced, he raises the bar with the 19-track set." The Village Voice wrote, "TP-2.com is a magnum opus of the genre, milking both Kelly's recent reflection and his baser inclinations for all they're worth." Wall of Sound wrote, "All in all, the production is sharp, with some fairly clever vocal and percussion arrangement ideas throughout." Billboard magazine ranked TP-2.com at number 94 on the magazine's Top 200 Albums of the Decade.

Accolades

Commercial performance
TP-2.com debuted number one on the Billboard 200 and number one on the Top R&B/Hip-Hop Albums chart, with first week sales of 543,000. The album went on to sell over four million copies.

Track listing

Personnel
Credits adapted from AllMusic.

 Boo – guest artist, rap
 Jim Bottari – mixing
 Glen Brown – engineer
 Cheek – engineer
 Joan Collaso – choir, chorus
 Dave Conner – programming
 Alex DeJonge – mixing
 Joe Donatello – engineer, programming
 Bill Douglass – mixing
 Tony Flores – mixing
 Yvonne Gage – choir, chorus
 Andy Gallas – engineer, programming
 Abel Garibaldi – engineer, programming
 Chris Gehringer – mastering
 General – rap
 Gotti – guest artist, rap
 Jessica Janis – children's chorus
 R. Kelly – arranger,  mixing, producer, vocals
 Gregg Landfair – guitar
 Jeff Lane – engineer
 James Lee – engineer, programming
 Ron Lowe – mixing
 Donnie Lyle – bass, guitar
 Paul Mabin – choir, chorus
 Tony Maserati – mixing
 Ian Mereness – engineer, programming
 Daniel Milazzo – mixing
 Peter Mokran – mixing
 Nick Monson – engineer
 Amber Morrow – children's chorus
 Jeffrey Morrow – choir, chorus
 Joseph Morrow – children's chorus
 John Nelson – mixing
 Kendall D. Nesbitt – keyboards
 Flip Osman – mixing
 Poke – producer
 Herb Powers – mastering
 Precision – producer
 Paul Riser – string arrangements
 Carl Robinson – engineer
 Leah Robinson – children's chorus
 Matthew Robinson – children's chorus
 Rachel Robinson – children's chorus
 David Swope – mixing
 Doug Swope – mixing
 Cyrille Taillandier – mixing
 Tone – producer
 Richard Travali – mixing
 Jeff Vereb – engineer
 Bill W. – programming
 Jeffrey Walker - engineer, mixing
 Cheryl Wilson – choir, chorus
 Stan Wood – engineer, programming

Later samples
 "The Greatest Sex"
 "I Smell Pussy" by G-Unit from the album Beg for Mercy
 "Boyfriend #2" by Pleasure P
 "Fiesta"
 "We F'd Up" by J Dilla from the album Pay Jay
 "A Woman's Threat"
 "Threat" by Jay-Z from the album The Black Album
 "This Is a Warning" by Lil' Kim from the album La Bella Mafia
 "One Me"
 "I'm a Winner" by Twista from the album The Day After

Charts

Weekly charts

Year-end charts

Certifications

See also
 List of number-one albums of 2000 (U.S.)
 List of number-one R&B albums of 2000 (U.S.)
 Billboard Year-End
 2000 in music

References

External links
 Official website
 

2000 albums
Albums produced by R. Kelly
R. Kelly albums
Sequel albums